Dimethylallyltranstransferase (DMATT), also known as farnesylpyrophosphate synthase (FPPS) or as farnesyldiphosphate synthase (FDPS), is an enzyme  that in humans is encoded by the FDPS gene and catalyzes the transformation of dimethylallylpyrophosphate (DMAPP) and isopentenyl pyrophosphate (IPP) into farnesylpyrophosphate (FPP).

Pyrophosphate is also involved, as both a reactant and a product. Geranylpyrophosphate is created in an intermediate step.

See also 
 Geranyltranstransferase

References

External links 
 
 

EC 2.5.1